Eosopostega issikii is a species of moth of the family Opostegidae. It is known only from the Izu Peninsula in south-central Honshu and from Kagoshima at the south-western tip of Kyushu.

The length of the forewings is about 3.8 mm for males. Adults are on wing in June in one generation.

Etymology
The species is named in honor of the late Professor Syuti Issiki, an eminent Japanese microlepidopterist and teacher who collected the holotype shortly before his death.

External links
Generic Revision of the Opostegidae, with a Synoptic Catalog of the World's Species (Lepidoptera: Nepticuloidea)

Opostegidae
Moths of Japan
Moths described in 1988